The Treason Outlawries (Scotland) Act 1748 (22 Geo.II c.48) was an Act of the Parliament of Great Britain which applied only to Scotland. Its long title was "An Act to ascertain and establish the Method of Proceeding to and upon Outlawries for High Treason and Misprision of High Treason, in Scotland."

The Act set out the procedure to be followed when anyone was prosecuted for treason or misprision of treason in Scotland. In particular, anyone who failed to surrender to the justice of the Scottish courts was to be automatically outlawed and attainted for the crime they were charged with, without the need for a trial, unless they had been out of Great Britain at the time, in which case they were still entitled to a trial provided that they returned and submitted themselves to the court within one year.

The Act was repealed in 1977, although it had been obsolete well before then.

References

See also
Treason Act
Treason Act 1708
Sheriffs (Scotland) Act 1747

Great Britain Acts of Parliament 1748
Treason in Scotland
Acts of the Parliament of Great Britain concerning Scotland
1748 in Scotland
Jacobite rising of 1745
Scottish criminal law